Polymastia lorum is a species of sea sponge belonging to the family Polymastiidae. It is only known from a single specimen found attached to a dead Glycimeris valve on a reef near Ohinau Island, one of the Mercury Islands off North Island, New Zealand.

This is a small encrusting sponge 4 cm across. The outer layer is yellow with an orange-red interior. The most remarkable feature of this sponge is the very long (up to 6 cm) strap-like papillae.

References

lorum
Sponges of New Zealand
Animals described in 1997
Taxa named by Patricia Bergquist
Taxa named by Michelle Kelly (marine scientist)